

Preseason
 October 5–6, 2001: Bulldogs head coach Shannon Miller, forwards Erika Holst, Maria Rooth, Hanne Sikio and goaltender Tuula Puputti represented UMD in the first-ever WCHA All-Star Team. The team played two exhibition games against the U.S. National Team.

Regular season
December 2: The 2001 National Champions were honored by the Minnesota Wild at the Xcel Energy Center.
February 23: The Bulldogs had their 50th WCHA win in just their third year of WCHA competition.

Player stats
Note: GP= Games played; G= Goals; A= Assists; PTS = Points; GW = Game Winning Goals; PPL = Power Play Goals; SHG = Short Handed Goals

International
 Seven Bulldogs traveled to Salt Lake City to compete in ice hockey at the 2002 Winter Olympics. Maria Rooth and Erika Holst played for bronze medal winner Sweden. Hanne Sikio and goaltender Tuula Puputti skated for fourth-place Finland and Kristina Petrovskaya finished fifth with Team Russia. The Bulldogs had two players in the Olympic gold medal game. Canadian Caroline Ouellette won the gold medal and American Jenny Potter won the silver medal.

Awards and honors
 November 6: Patricia Sautter received the USCHO Defensive Player of the Week.
Sautter also received the WCHA Rookie of the Week honors. She helped the Bulldogs sweep the Wisconsin Badgers women's ice hockey program in an away series with 1–0 and 2–1 wins.
November 26: Hanne Sikio received the Bulldogs first ever USCHO Offensive Player of the Week award.
In addition, Sikio received her second career WCHA Player of the Week honors.
March 21: Maria Rooth, 2001–2002 All-American honors (It was the second consecutive year that she was selected as an All-American)

Postseason
March 24: Joanne Eustace and defenseman Larissa Luther were selected to the 2002 NCAA All-Tournament Team
April 2: The Bulldogs were honored for their athletic and academic achievements at the State Capitol, where resolutions were read, authorized by State Representative Tom Huntley and State Senator Yvonne Prettner-Solon.
May 9: The Bulldogs were honored by the Regents of University of Minnesota and President Mark G. Yudolf.
May 16: Maria Rooth, Verizon Academic All-District At-Large second team.
May 21: The two-time National Champions traveled to Washington D.C. to be honored by President George W. Bush for the second consecutive time.

References

External links
Official site

Minnesota-Duluth
NCAA women's ice hockey Frozen Four seasons
NCAA women's ice hockey championship seasons
Minnesota Duluth Bulldogs women's ice hockey seasons